Samuel Ray Little (born March 29, 1946) is a retired professional basketball player who spent one season in the American Basketball Association (ABA) as a member of the Kentucky Colonels during the 1969–70 season after a successful college career at Delta State University. While he was not drafted into the National Basketball Association (NBA) after graduating from Delta State, the New Orleans Buccaneers did select him in the 1969 ABA Draft.

Little was also a coach, heading Utah Valley University's men's basketball team for the first two seasons in the program's history (1972–1974).

External links

Delta State Hall of Fame profile

1946 births
Living people
American men's basketball coaches
American men's basketball players
Basketball coaches from Kentucky
Basketball players from Kentucky
Delta State Statesmen basketball players
Guards (basketball)
Junior college men's basketball coaches in the United States
Kentucky Colonels players
New Orleans Buccaneers draft picks
Utah Valley Wolverines men's basketball coaches